Josef Leopold (18 February 1889 – 24 June 1941) was a leading member of the Nazi Party in Austria. He was the Landesleiter of the party from 1935 to 1938 and the head of the Sturmabteilung in Austria. He belonged to the pro-independence tendency within Austrian Nazism and insisted that Adolf Hitler was only a spiritual leader rather than a future Austrian leader.

Early career
Leopold was a native of the rural Waldviertel and, with little formal education, was expected to devote his life working his peasant father's small farm. Leopold however followed a military career, joining the 49th Infantry Regiment of the Austro-Hungarian Army on 7 October 1910. He left the army in 1913, having reached the rank of sergeant but returned following the outbreak of the First World War. Leopold saw action on the Eastern Front until 1915 when he was captured by the Russians. He was sent to Siberia as a prisoner of war and remained in a camp until February 1918 when he escaped, returning to Austria. Soon after this he saw service with the Volkswehr and following the reorganisation of the military after the establishment of the republic he was retained in the new Austrian Army as an instructor of new recruits.

Leopold's initial involvement in politics came in December 1918 when he joined the Social Democratic Party of Austria. However, by the following year Leopold had switched sides to join Walter Riehl's  and he became a convinced activist in the party after hearing Adolf Hitler speaking at Krems an der Donau in 1920. Leopold quickly rose through the ranks, so that by 1926 he was leader of the Sturmabteilung in Lower Austria as well as deputy Gauleiter of that region. With the support of Hitler he became full Gauleiter in 1927 and was soon the leading critic of Karl Schulz, whose faction of the Austrian Nazi Party was decidedly anti-Germany in outlook.

Leopold led a faction within Austrian Nazism that was underground in nature and which frequently launched terrorist attacks. His position as an extremist who supported independence meant that he clashed with the pro-Greater Germany wing of Theodor Habicht and the constitutional pro-independence wing under Anton Reinthaller. Following the banning of the Nazi Party in Austria in 1933 the fanatical Leopold was the only Gauleiter who refused to flee Austria. This resulted in his being interned in Wöllersdorf concentration camp from January 1934 to February 1935, a fact which precluded any involvement in the failed July Putsch of 1934.

Leadership of the Nazis
Leopold became leader of the Austrian Nazi Party in December 1934 but was again interned in 1935 following the banning of the Nazi Party, although he was released the following year when Adolf Hitler concluded a friendship treaty with Kurt Schuschnigg. Although still party leader officially, Leopold found that during his time in prison real power within the party passed to Friedrich Rainer and Odilo Globocnik who, on Hitler's express instructions, were seeking to build alliances with more conservative leaders such as Arthur Seyss-Inquart and even Kurt Schuschnigg.

Later in 1936 he negotiated with Schuschnigg in an attempt to regain legal status for the Nazi Party. Leopold hoped through this to become part of a coalition government and to eventually form an independent Nazi government in Austria. He then sought to work more closely with other nationalist groups in order to come closer to his ideal of a Nazi Austria and in this endeavour won the backing of cabinet ministers Edmund Glaise-Horstenau and Odo Neustädter-Stürmer. Indeed, Leopold came out of the negotiations badly as not only were his plans to reconstitute the Nazi Party as part of the Fatherland's Front made public but he also failed to secure an offer of a cabinet post as he had hoped.

His failures in the negotiations and his pro-independence stance meant that Hitler did not trust Leopold's power and so he sent Wilhelm Keppler to keep a watch on him in July 1937. However Keppler was told by Leopold that he took orders from no one. Heinrich Himmler made him leader of the Austrian Schutzstaffel in 1937 but he soon grew tired of the quarrelsome Leopold, who also had clashes with Hermann Göring, Rudolf Hess, Franz von Papen and his co-leader of the Austrian Nazis Hermann Neubacher. Whilst leading the Nazis in Vienna during 1938 Leopold boasted to British Union of Fascists representative Robert Gordon-Canning that he was about to lead an uprising with Hitler's aid. However the conversation was picked up by Schuschnigg who raided Leopold's office where documents relating to the coup plot were seized. Hitler finally dismissed Leopold as Landesleiter in February 1938 on the pretext that he wanted Austrian Nazis to follow legality. Hitler, who had been due to hold talks with Schuschnigg, was especially annoyed that Leopold had launched a bombing campaign in the run-up to the meeting, and so moved for his dismissal.

Under the Nazis
Following the Anschluss Leopold was able to continue as a figure within the Nazi Party despite his earlier support for an independent Austria. He served as an SA inspector in Munich, where he also worked under Hess at the Nazi Party Chancellery, before entering the Wehrmacht in October 1939 as an Oberstleutnant. He was briefly considered for the role of Gauleiter of Lower Danube although this role went to Hugo Jury instead. He was Alfred Rosenberg's choice for the role of General Commissar for Crimea although he was killed in action just after the invasion of the Soviet Union and ultimately the role went to fellow Austrian Alfred Frauenfeld.

References

1889 births
1941 deaths
People from Krems-Land District
Austro-Hungarian military personnel of World War I
Austrian prisoners of war
World War I prisoners of war held by Russia
Austrian escapees
Escapees from Russian detention
Social Democratic Party of Austria politicians
Austrian Nazis
German Army personnel killed in World War II
Sturmabteilung officers
Members of the Reichstag of Nazi Germany
German Army officers of World War II